David Allen Rundle (born January 4, 1965) is an American serial killer and rapist who murdered three young women in Sacramento and Placer County, California over six months in 1986. He admitted to all three killings, blaming his actions on mental illness and abuse he received as a child. Convicted of all three murders and sentenced to death for two of them, he is currently on death row.

Early life 
David Allen Rundle was born in Nevada County on January 4, 1965, the son of chief warrant officer for the United States Navy David William Rundle. Although born in California, his family moved to live in Idaho. According to his parents, he was a normal child who enjoyed fishing and hunting, which changed when he fell into a drug addiction at age 14. In later years it came out that his mother sexually abused him in his youth. His parents later moved Georgia, where he attended high school but dropped out not long after. After a while they moved to Colfax, California, where the family stopped seeing Rundle. In 1984, Rundle got married, but once his wife fell pregnant he abandoned her. Instead, his parents started taking care of her.

Murders

Elizabeth Lactawen 
In May 1986 Rundle, high on marijuana, was pacing around the Sacramento River near Front Street, an area known for a high population of vagrants. While there he chatted up one transient, 21-year-old Elizabeth Latorre Lactawen. According to Rundle, he was able to convince her to follow him to the bushes where the two proceeded to have sex. Rundle then claimed he "freaked out" and out of instinct started strangling her until she died. He left her dead body beneath the Pioneer Bridge in Sacramento, where it was found on May 10 by an unidentified person who called into the Secret Witness Program. In the investigation a witness who saw the killer came forward to police, and due to Rundle, then 21, looking young for his age, the attacker was described as looking like a 17-year-old male who was about 5ft 10inch. A reward of $2,500 was announced to anyone who could identify the killer.

Carolyn Garcia 
On September 7, having voyaged to Colfax, Rundle abducted 18-year-old Carolyn Marie Garcia from a bus stop as she waited for a bus to drive her to the city of Roseville. He drove her to a remote area near Rollins Lake Road where he partially stripped her of her clothes, raped, beat and strangled her to death. Her body remained missing until mid-November, though sheriff Donald J. Nunes had stated publicly that she had likely been killed, as her bloody clothing had been recovered just off of Interstate 80.

LanciAnne Sorensen 
Rundle killed his youngest and final victim on October 7, when he abducted 15-year-old LanciAnne Sorensen. He forced her to take her pants off, which he then used to bind her hands behind her back, and then raped and strangled her to death. He left her body just of an Interstate 80 off ramp in Loomis. The body was found a few weeks later.

Arrest 
Rundle was identified by witnesses as the last person seen with Garcia. On September 11, Rundle narrowly avoided arrest after he rammed his vehicle into the back of a police car on Rollins Lake Road. There, police had been scouring the area searching for Garcia's body. Rundle wrecked his car but managed to flee the area. Police were subsequently able to identify him and attempt to locate him. In response Rundle fled to Carson City, Nevada, where he was arrested on November 20 and returned to California. Out of apparent guilt, Rundle confessed to the other two murders. In an interview with detectives, Rundle said he knew he was a sick individual. He blamed his actions on mental illness and abuse he received as a child, which only got worse with drug and alcohol addiction.

Trial and imprisonment 
On April 16, 1987, Rundle was attacked in his sleep by his cellmate Melton Eugene Voight, who was awaiting trial for armed robbery. Rundle was hospitalized for 10 days, while Voight was moved to Folsom State Prison for his violent outburst.

Rundle was sentenced to death in 1989 for the murders of Garcia and Sorensen. As the sentence was being handed down multiple jurors were reported crying. He was also given a life sentence for the murder of Lactawen. He is currently incarcerated at San Quentin State Prison.

See also 
 List of death row inmates in the United States
 List of serial killers in the United States

External links 
 CDCR Inmate Information

References 

1965 births
1986 murders in the United States
20th-century American criminals
American male criminals
American people convicted of murder
American prisoners sentenced to death
American serial killers
Criminals from California
Living people
Male serial killers
People convicted of murder by California
Prisoners sentenced to death by California
Violence against women in the United States